was a town located in Nishiyatsushiro District, Yamanashi Prefecture, Japan.

As of 2003, the town had an estimated population of 3,861 and a population density of 290.74 persons per km². The total area was 13.28 km².

On October 1, 2005, Rokugō, along with the towns of Ichikawadaimon and Mitama (all from Nishiyatsushiro District), was merged to create the town of Ichikawamisato.

External links
 Ichikawamisato official website 

Dissolved municipalities of Yamanashi Prefecture
Ichikawamisato, Yamanashi